CNN Philippines New Day (simply New Day) is the English language morning newscast of CNN Philippines. Patterned after its U.S. counterpart CNN New Day, it replaced CNN Philippines Headline News. The show premiered February 15, 2016, as part of a major programming revamp brought by the appointment of Armie Jarin-Bennett as managing editor of CNN Philippines. It airs weekdays from 6:00 AM to 7:00 AM. It is originally anchored by Headline News holdover, the late Amelyn Veloso, and Claudine Trillo, as well as CNN Philippines Sports Desk morning edition anchor Andrei Felix and Atty. Karen Jimeno. Felix, Ria Tanjuatco-Trillo, Christine Jacob-Sandejas and Paolo Abrera currently serve as anchors.

Premise
The newscast's tagline is "Where we bring all the news you need and more", wherein the program will give a daily dose of relevant headlines, nationally, locally or internationally, as well as news from business, health, sports, entertainment, tech, trends, lifestyle and more to start your day right. It also offers one-on-one interview with different people to tackle latest topics.

History

First on-air and changes (2016–2020)

CNN Philippines New Day premiered on February 15, 2016, replacing Headline News as English morning news program of CNN Philippines air at earlier 6 am slot, instead of 7 am (which been used by its predecessors, Solar/9TV Daybreak and Headline News.) It is the second localized edition of a program of CNN Philippines after the successful launch of CNN Philippines Newsroom. In October 2016, one of its anchors, Atty. Karen Jimeno left the newscast as she was appointed as Department of Transportation Officer, leaving Veloso, Trillo and Felix alone but she is still included in OBB. In February 2017, Veloso and Trillo left the show and was replaced by Claire Celdran, James Deakin, Christine Jacob-Sandejas and Angel Jacob as new anchors, leaving Felix the only remained mainstay in the news show. Meanwhile, Claire Celdran left the show and the morning edition of Newsroom focusing more family time, but returned to the network to anchor the Weekend edition of Newsroom, but later left the said newscast. Also, Angel Jacob left the show as she focuses on her program, Leading Women and she was replaced by Ria Tanjuatco-Trillo, Mike Alimurung, (who was anchored his program "Business Roundup") and Dr. Freddie Gomez (host of "MedTalk/HealthTalk").

COVID-19 change and Revamp (2020–present)
On March 17, 2020, production was halted on March 18, 2020, due to the enhanced community quarantine in Luzon caused by the COVID-19 pandemic. The show resumed its programming on April 13, 2020, in a 30-minute morning newscast solo anchored by Tanjuatco-Trillo. By October 19, Broadcaster and TV Host Paolo Abrera joins Tanjuatco-Trillo, Felix and Jacob-Sandejas. Along with his departure, a new OBB and logo (which patterned to the U.S. counterpart), and theme song was also unveiled and it became a 1-hour morning news program aired from 6:00 am to 7:00 am, instead of its original timeslot from 6:00 am to 7:30 am.

Anchors
 Ria Tanjuatco-Trillo (2018–present)
 Andrei Felix (2016–present)
 Christine Jacob-Sandejas (2017–present)
 Paolo Abrera (2020–present)
 Dr. Freddie Gomez (occasional, 2018–present)

Former anchors
 Karen Jimeno (2016; now with SMNI)
 Amelyn Veloso† (2016–2017)
 Claudine Trillo (2016–2017)
 Angel Jacob  (2017–2018)
 Claire Celdran (2017–2018; formerly relief anchor for Veloso)
 James Deakin (2017–2020)
 Mike Alimurung (2018–2020)

Guest anchors
 Ruth Cabal (also a reporter)
 Ina Andolong (also a reporter)
 Joyce Ilas (also a reporter)
 Anjo Alimario (also a reporter)
 David Santos (also a reporter)
 Rico Hizon

Segments
Global Headlines
Regional News
Business Report
Sports Desk
The Doctor is In
Technology
Talk
Weather Forecast
Entertainment
Traffic Center

See also
 List of programs broadcast by CNN Philippines

References

2016 Philippine television series debuts
2020s Philippine television series
CNN Philippines original programming
CNN Philippines
CNN Philippines News and Current Affairs
English-language television shows
Philippine television news shows
Breakfast television in the Philippines
Television productions suspended due to the COVID-19 pandemic